Russian North is an ethnocultural region situated in the northwestern part of Russia. It spans the regions of Arkhangelsk Oblast, the Republic of Karelia, Komi Republic, Vologda Oblast and Nenets Autonomous Okrug). It is known for its traditions of folk art - in particular, wooden architecture, wood and bone carving and painting. Due to its remoteness, the rural parts of Russian North preserve much of the archaic aspects of Russian culture during the 19th and 20th centuries, making it of particular interest to historians, culturologists and ethnographers.

History 
The initial Russian colonization of the Russian North started independently from Novgorod and Rostov. Genetic studies show that the populations of Russian North have a significant Finnic admixture, which is not typical for more southern Russian populations. The pre-Russian (most likely Finno-Ugric) populations of Russian North were recorded as "Zavoloshka Chudes" in chronicles. Russian North is rich in toponyms and hydronyms of possibly Finno-Ugric substrate origin, which were extensively studied by many linguists, most notably A. K. Matveyev.

The Russian North was gradually colonized by Slavs since at least the XI-XII centuries. Initially the area was incorporated into the Novgorod Republic which, in its turn, in the XV century was incorporated into Grand Duchy of Moscow. The climate of the Russian North is harsh, with minimum possibilities for agriculture, therefore fishing, hunting for marine mammals, as well as the salt-cooking industry, became alternatives for the people living in the area. By the late XVI century the White Sea port of Archangelsk became the major gateway for the Russian commerce with Europe. Since the Russian North seemed the perfect place for a religious escape from the world, orthodox monasteries, with their ambitions and possibilities (through religion and economic power), were critical for the Russian North economy. Northern Thebaid is the poetic name of the northern Russian lands surrounding Vologda and Belozersk, appeared as a comparison with the Egyptian area Thebaid - well-known settling place of early Christian monks and hermits.

Most of the Russian North territories never had serfdom, at least the way it existed in central Russian agricultural regions.

Demographics 
The White Sea coastal part of the Russian North is home to Pomors, a unique subethnic group of Russians with a maritime culture not typical of other Russian subethnic groups. Moreover, the Russian North is home to numerous Old Believer communities.

Tourism 
Russian North is a major tourist destination due to the large amount of both natural and cultural places of interest (Kizhi Pogost, Valaam, Kirillo-Belozersky Monastery, etc.)

Gallery

See also 
 Novgorod Republic
 Northern Russian dialects
 Northern Thebaid
 Russky Sever National Park
 Northern economic region (Russia)
 Far North (Russia)
 Atlantis of the Russian North - a 2015 documentary movie about the region

References

External links 
 Atlantis of the Russian North (full documentary w/ English subtitles)

Regions of Russia
Russian culture